The following is a list of programs broadcast by Kentucky Educational Television (KET), a PBS-affiliated statewide network based in Lexington, Kentucky, which serves the entire state of Kentucky and portions of neighboring states.

Local programming

Current 
Bluegrass and Backroads – produced by Kentucky Farm Bureau
bookclub at KET
Comment on Kentucky (1974–present)
Connections with Renee Shaw (2005–present) 
GED Connection (2002–present) 
Great Conversations - interviews with famous authors
Health Three60
Jubilee (1990?-present) - featuring music performances of local bluegrass and country bands around Kentucky. 
Kentucky Afield (1985–present)
Kentucky Collectables (2012–present)
Kentucky Edition (2022-present) – statewide news program
Kentucky Health (2015–present) – focusing on health issues in Kentucky. 
Kentucky Life (1995–present)
Kentucky Muse (2008–present) – focuses on culture in Kentucky 
Kentucky Time Capsule – Kentucky history. 
Kentucky Tonight (1994–present) 
Louisville Life (2006–present)
News Quiz (1985–present) - a KET-produced newscast for students in Grades 3-6. Features national news headlines, and a quiz for the students to take when the program is viewed in the schools.  
One to One with Bill Goodman (2006–present) 
Pre-GED Connection
Tim Farmer's Country Kitchen - Hosted and produced by former "Kentucky Afield" host Tim Farmer and his wife Nikki.
U of L Today with Mark Hebert - news magazine program devoted to the University of Louisville 
Video Vault – showcasing some public domain content such as old films and select episodes of old shows. 
Video Vault: Kentucky Edition – showcasing some public domain content involving some Kentuckians with ties to the film industry. 
Wildcat Insights – magazine program devoted to the University of Kentucky 
Woodsongs – visual version of the radio program of the same name, featuring Kentucky's Bluegrass music talents.

Former

Series
Captioned Kentucky News (1984-1998?) -- captioned/subtitled versions of local 6 p.m. and/or 7 p.m. newscasts by various television stations in Lexington and Louisville.   
Bywords (1982-1985, reruns available on KY Channel and on KET.org) 
Distinguished Kentuckian (1974-1992, reruns available on KY Channel and on KET.org) – interviews with people with notable accomplishments in Kentucky
East of Ninaveh (1986–87) 
Education Notebook (1987) 
From the Ground Up (1991–92, reruns available on KY channel and on KET.org) – show about architecture in Kentucky
GED -- Get it! (1993-199?) 
GED on TV (1975-1976?)
Kentucky Author Forum Presents
Kentucky Considered
Kentucky Journal
Kentucky Magazine
Kentucky Now 
KET Scholastic Challenge (1980s) -- quiz bowl-style program  
Legislative Update (1978-2004) -- replaced with live legislative coverage on KET5 and KET6 (2004–07), and then the Kentucky Channel since 2008
The Lonesome Pine Specials (198?-199?)
McClain County Festival (1974) Mountain Born The People's BusinessA Reflection of Kentucky (1972) Run That By Me Again (1977-1981, reruns available on Kentucky channel) – interviews with former Kentucky athletes involved with the biggest events involving Kentucky's college football and basketball programs.Signature (1990s) -- nationally distributed

Locally-produced instructional seriesAnother Page (1988, reruns continued through 2005)Another Page. Archived from the original April 13, 2015. Retrieved January 15, 2023.Dealing in Discipline Imagine ThatKentucky GeoQuest (1993, occasional reruns continued on KET Star Channels and KET-ED through 2009)Learn to Read (1987-1988, reruns continued through 2005, produced in association with WXYZ-TV/Detroit, Michigan)  Math Basics (1992–93, reruns continued through 2012)Math Country (1978) Old Music for New Ears (1992-1993) Signature (1994-1998) - nationally broadcast by PBSStreet Smarts (1998) The Universe and I (1976-198?, KET's first nationally distributed ITV series) Workplace Essentials Skills (1999-200?)Write Right (1985, part of KET/GED library) 

Notable documentaries by KETAlong Kentucky 80 (1992) -- John Ed Pearce's cross-state driving journey along Kentucky Route 80Kentucky Is My Land (1969) -- KET's first ever instructional television documentaryThe KET Story (September 23, 2018) -- KET's 50th Anniversary program highlighting the network's historyLouisville Symphony in Moscow (1990) -- concert film of the Louisville Symphony's performance abroadOn The Ohio (1987) -- John Ed Pearce's journey along the Ohio River from Ashland to WickliffeOur Kentucky'' (February 28, 2009) -- a high-definition broadcast profiling Kentucky's landscape

Political programming 
In 1975, KET broadcast its first Gubernatorial debate. Then in 1979, the network broadcast is first Gubernatorial election night coverage, and has covered every single one ever since.

See also
Kentucky Educational Television
American Public Television
List of programs broadcast by PBS
List of programs broadcast by PBS Kids

References

External links
KET | Programs - more in-depth information of all of KET's programming 
Kentucky Educational Television official website

 
 

Kentucky Educational Television
Lists of television series by network
Kentucky Educational Television